S.S.C. Napoli won an international trophy for the first time, defeating Stuttgart 2-1 and drawing 3-3 in the two-legged final. Napoli did not match Inter in the domestic league, but recorded a second place, its fourth consecutive podium finish in the final standings.

Squad

Transfers

Competitions

Serie A

League table

Results by round

Matches

Topscorers
  Careca 19
  Andrea Carnevale 13
  Diego Maradona 9
  Alemão 3

Coppa Italia

First Round- Group phase

Second round

Quarter-finals

Semi-finals

Final

UEFA Cup

Eightfinals

Quarterfinals

Semifinals

Final

Statistics

Players statistics

References

Sources
  RSSSF - Italy 1988/89

S.S.C. Napoli seasons
Napoli
UEFA Europa League-winning seasons